The Women's 50 metre breaststroke competition of the 2022 European Aquatics Championships was held on 16 and 17 August 2022.

Records
Prior to the competition, the existing world, European and championship records were as follows.

Results

Heats
The heats were started on 16 August at 09:45.

Semifinals
The semifinals were started on 16 August at 18:31.

Final
The final was held on 17 August at 18:05.

References

Women's 50 metre breaststroke